Park Byung-Hyo (born 18 August 1962) is a Korean former wrestler who competed in the 1984 Summer Olympics.

References

External links
 

1962 births
Living people
Olympic wrestlers of South Korea
Wrestlers at the 1984 Summer Olympics
South Korean male sport wrestlers
20th-century South Korean people